Konstantinos Davakis (1897 – 21 January 1943) was a Greek military officer in World War II. He organized the Greek defensive lines during the Battle of Pindus that led to Italian defeat in the first stage of the Greco-Italian War of 1940.

Early life

He was born in the village of Kechrianika outside of Sparta, Laconia prefecture in 1897. After graduating from the Hellenic Military Academy as a Second lieutenant, he saw action in World War I, distinguishing himself in the battle of Skra-di-Legen and the battle of Doiran. After taking part in the Greco-Turkish War (1919–1922), Davakis wrote a number of works on military history and armoured warfare while also teaching at military academies.

Greco-Italian War
Davakis was a colonel when Italy attacked Greece on 28 October 1940. As commander of the Pindus detachment (Απόσπασμα Πίνδου), he successfully repelled the Italian Julia Alpine Division's attack in late October 1940 but was seriously injured in November of the same year, when he counter-attacked, nearly destroying it.

Davakis' detachment, composed of two infantry battalions of the 51st Infantry Regiment, one cavalry troop and one artillery battery, was the first Greek unit that received the "blow" of the Italian invasion. Davakis' forces were overstretched, covering a 30 km front on mountainous terrain. His unit resisted the Julia Division's advance for two days, by which time sufficient reinforcements could be brought up to contain and defeat the Italians.

Wounding and death
On 2 November 1940, near the village of Samarina, while directing his unit, Davakis was hit in the chest suffering serious lung injury and lapsing into a coma. Although he regained consciousness two days later, he remained hospitalized in battlefield. In December 1942, he was arrested by the Italian occupation authorities, along with other Greek officers, suspected of participation in the Greek Resistance. The officers were to be shipped to POW camps in Italy on the liner Città di Genova, but the ship was torpedoed and sank off southern Albania in January 1943. Davakis' body was recognized by local Greeks and buried at Vlorë. His bones were transferred to Athens after the war.

Legacy
The military camp "Colonel Konstantinos Davakis" in Sparta bears his name.

References

Sources
Kōstas N. Chatzēpateras, Maria S. Phaphaliou, Patrick Leigh Fermor. Greece 1940-41 eyewitnessed. Efstathiadis Group, 1995, .
An abridged history of the Greek-Italian and Greek-German war, 1940-1941: (land operations). Hellenic Army General Staff, Army History Directorate, 1997.

1890s births
1943 deaths
People from East Mani
Hellenic Army officers
Greek military personnel of World War I
Greek military personnel of the Greco-Turkish War (1919–1922)
Greek military personnel killed in World War II
Greco-Italian War